Colin Stuart Matthews (17 October 1931 – 15 March 1990) was an English first-class cricketer active 1950–59 who played for Nottinghamshire. He was born and died in Worksop.

References

1931 births
1990 deaths
English cricketers
Nottinghamshire cricketers
Combined Services cricketers